WAY-204688, also known as SIM-688, is a synthetic nonsteroidal estrogen and nuclear factor κB (NF-κB) inhibitor which was originated by ArQule and Wyeth and was under development by Wyeth for the treatment of rheumatoid arthritis, non-specific inflammation, and sepsis but was never marketed. Inhibition of NF-κB by WAY-204688 appears to be dependent on agonism of the ERα, as it is reversed by the ERα antagonist fulvestrant, but is not dependent on the ERβ. In contrast to the case of NF-κB inhibition, WAY-204688 produces only slight elevation of creatine kinase in vitro, a measure of classical estradiol effects. It reached phase I clinical trials prior to the discontinuation of its development.

References

External links
 SIM-688 (WAY-204688) - AdisInsight

4-Phenylpiperidines
Abandoned drugs
Biased ligands
Ethers
Ketones
1-Naphthyl compounds
Nitriles
Synthetic estrogens
Trifluoromethyl compounds